Maurice Berthe, born on March 29, 1935, in Prades and died on November 21, 2015, in Toulouse, was a French medievalist.

Background 
There he founded the UMR Framespa, of which he was the first director.

In line with his mentor, he was interested in the economic and social history of the end of the Middle Ages, and rural history however. His work has focused on demography, economy, land use and settlement in the South of France and northern Spain. He is the author of Le comté de Bigorre, un milieu rural au bas Moyen Age , as well as Famines et épidémies dans les campagnes navarraises à la fin du Moyen Âge.

References

External links 
 Berthe, Maurice

French medievalists
20th-century French historians
1935 births
2015 deaths